Red Pineapple is a German apple cultivar which is widely used in Denmark.

Sonneruplund recommends this apple variety for private gardens, as it can be grown without the use of pesticides.

References

External links
Rød Ananas. - Article from NordGen.

German apples
Apple cultivars